The Order of Kurmet (Qurmet ordeni) or the Order of Honour is an order awarded by the government of Kazakhstan since 1993. It is awarded to citizens of Kazakhstan who have exhibited merit in the fields of economics, science, culture, social issues, and education. The order has no grades or classes.

Recipients
A partial list of recipients of the award follows.

Politics and administration

 Maulen Ashimbaev, Deputy Head of the Administration of the President of the Republic Kazakhstan
 Serik Baimaganbetov, Minister of Internal Affairs
 Talgat Donakov, Deputy Head of the Administration of the President of the Republic of Kazakhstan
 Baktykozha Izmukhambetov, governor of West Kazakhstan Province
 A. Kussainov, Minister of Transport and Communications of the Republic of Kazakhstan
 Mukhtar Kul-Mukhammed, Minister of Culture and Information
 Kanat Saudabayev, Ambassador to the United States
 Marat Tazhin, Minister of Foreign Affairs
Nurlan Yermekbayev, Minister of Defense

Business and economics
Arken Arystanov, Chairman of the Regional Financial Center of Almaty city.
Kanat Bozumbayev, President of KEGOC
Kenzhebek Ibrashev, Vice-President of National Company KazMunayGas
Maksat Idenov, First Vice President of National Oil and Gas Company KazMunayGas
David J. O'Reilly, CEO of Chevron
Alexandr Poyarel, General Director of Kazphosphate
Saken Seifullin, Chairman of Seimar Alliance Policy Insurance JSC and the former CEO of FoodMaster.
Vyacheslav Kim, Kazakh economist and financier, co-founder of Kaspi.kz

Science and technology
 Talapkali Izmuhambetov, director of Republican Medical College
 Gulnaz Akhmetova, Deputy Chairman of the Academic Methodologies Council of the Ministry of Education and Science

Culture and the arts

At a ceremony in Almaty, Deputy Minister of Culture and Information of Kazakhstan, Askar Buribaev handed awards to Kazakh cultural and art workers.
Dukesh Baimbetov (Radio and TV)
 Dinmukhamet Akhimov (actor)
 Kudaibergen Sultanbaev (actor)
 Koeman Tastanbekov (actor)
 Meruert Utekesheva (actor)
 Kasim Zhakibaev (actor)
 Bakhit Zhangalieva (actor)
 Maigul Muzbayeva (actor)
 Smagul Yelubay (writer)
 Zaure Aitayeva (architect) at a ceremony dedicated to Astana EXPO 2017

See also
Orders, decorations, and medals of Kazakhstan

References

Orders, decorations, and medals of Kazakhstan